Herbert Reginald Sutterby (25 April 1899 – 17 September 1955) was an Australian rules footballer who played with Geelong in the Victorian Football League (VFL).

Notes

External links 

1899 births
1955 deaths
Australian rules footballers from Victoria (Australia)
Geelong Football Club players